The Dice Game of Life (German:Des Lebens Würfelspiel) is a 1925 German silent film directed by Heinz Paul and starring Frida Richard, Hella Moja and Margarete Lanner.

The film's art direction was by Botho Hoefer and Bernhard Schwidewski.

Cast
 Frida Richard as Frau Witwe Krüger  
 Hella Moja as Aenne, ihre Tochter  
 Margarete Lanner as Lotte, Aennes Freundin  
 Gerhard Ritterband as Laufbursche im Blumenhaus  
 Paul Hartmann as Hanns Freiherr v. Rhoden  
 Arnold Korff as Kommandeur des Ulanen-Regiments  
 Hans Brausewetter as Emil Päschke, sein Bursche  
 Wilhelm Diegelmann as Wilh. Päschke, Vater  
 Ilka Grüning as Emils Mutter  
 Hermann Vallentin as Kommerzienrat Reichenberg  
 Olga Engl as Reichenbergs Frau  
 Frizzi Richard as Ise - beider Tochter  
 Ferdinand von Alten as Bankier George Neumann  
 Karl Platen as Sein Diener  
 Albert Paulig as Theaterdirektor  
 Rudolf Klein-Rhoden as Großindustrieller Stenis  
 Fritz Beckmann as Stellenvermittler  
 Fritz Ruß as Lohndiener

References

Bibliography
 Grange, William. Cultural Chronicle of the Weimar Republic. Scarecrow Press, 2008.

External links

1925 films
Films of the Weimar Republic
Films directed by Heinz Paul
German silent feature films
German black-and-white films